The 1973 Western Illinois Leathernecks football team represented Western Illinois University as an independent during the 1973 NCAA Division II football season. They were led by fifth-year head coach Darrell Mudra and played their home games at Hanson Field. The Leathernecks finished the season with a 7–4 record. The team received a bid to the inaugural NCAA Division II Football Championship, where they lost to Louisiana Tech in the quarterfinal.

Schedule

References

Western Illinois
Western Illinois Leathernecks football seasons
Western Illinois Leathernecks football